Karl Johan Ryno (born June 5, 1986 in Örebro, Sweden) is a Swedish former professional ice hockey player. He most recently played for HC Lugano in the National League (NL). Ryno was drafted 137th overall by the Detroit Red Wings in the 2005 NHL Entry Draft.

Playing career
In 2007, he signed a three-year, entry-level contract with the Red Wings, but only played 12 games for the Grand Rapids Griffins of AHL, totalling 7 points. For the remainder of the contract, the Red Wings loaned Ryno  to the Stockholm-based team Djurgårdens IF and later AIK. In 2010, he signed a two-year contract deal with IK Oskarshamn in the Swedish second-tier league. Ryno would later sign a contract with Leksands IF who would later gain entry via promotion to the SHL.

Career statistics

Regular season and playoffs

International

References

External links 

1986 births
AIK IF players
Detroit Red Wings draft picks
Djurgårdens IF Hockey players
Färjestad BK players
Frölunda HC players
Grand Rapids Griffins players
IK Oskarshamn players
Leksands IF players
Living people
HC Lugano players
Swedish ice hockey right wingers
Timrå IK players
Sportspeople from Örebro